The Politics of Brandenburg takes place within a framework of a federal parliamentary representative democratic republic, where the Federal Government of Germany exercises sovereign rights with certain powers reserved to the states of Germany including Brandenburg. The three main parties are the centre leftist Social Democratic Party of Germany (SPD), the leftist Left Party and the centre rightist Christian Democratic Union.

Every five years, all Germans residing in the State over the age of 18 elect the members of the Landtag of Brandenburg. This regional parliament or legislature then elects the Minister-President and confirms the cabinet members.

List of minister presidents of Brandenburg

 1947 - 1949: Karl Steinhoff (SED, formerly SPD)
 1949 - 1952: Rudolf Jahn (SED)
 1990 - 2002: Manfred Stolpe (SPD)
 2002 - 2013: Matthias Platzeck (SPD)
 2013: Dietmar Woidke (SPD)

September, 2004 State Election 

See also Elections in Germany